Edmund J. Kalau (9 July 1928 – 8 January 2014) was a German aviator, missionary, and pastor. He was a member of the Hitler Youth during his childhood prior to his conversion to Christianity. As an adult, Kalau served as a missionary in Micronesia with his wife, Elizabeth. They founded the Pacific Missionary Aviation (PMA) to facilitate air travel throughout Micronesia.

Biography

Early life and World War II
Kalau was born on 9 July 1928 in East Prussia. At the age of 10 he joined the Hitler Youth, and went on to attend Hitler Youth Leadership High School and the Hitler Youth Flying Corps. After World War II, he encountered a Russian doctor who converted him from atheism to Christianity.

During his life, Kalau studied anthropology at the Philadelphia University, and earned a U.S. pilot's license and mechanics license at Peterborough Flying School.

Missionary work
In 1950 Kalau entered the Theological Seminary of Liebenzell Mission to begin a four-year training to become a missionary. He married Elisabeth Grünewald on 15 October 1954. He was ordained in 1954 and trained in Schooley's Mountain, New Jersey and at the Nyack Missionary College.

Kalau and his wife arrived in Palau in January 1956. Kalau established a Lutheran Servicemen's Center in Anigua, Guam in the late 1950s, which eventually developed into the Lutheran Church of Guam. After three years on Palau, they joined Johannes Aigesiil and his wife to serve on Yap. As part of an effort to fight alcoholism on Yap, Kalau helped construct a youth center.

Pacific Missionary Aviation

A part of the Kalaus' missionary work in Micronesia involved ferrying sick people to district hospitals on the mainland. They established the Pacific Missionary Aviation (PMA) in 1974 to provide faster transport to the people of Micronesia. This strained the Kalaus' relation with the Liebenzell Mission and they eventually severed ties.

The PMA started with a twin-engine plane. It was incorporated in Guam on 24 April 1974 and began aviation services the next year. It expanded to the Philippines in 1982 under the name Flying Medical Samaritans (FMS) to avoid confusion with the Philippine Military Academy. By 1992, the PMA had eight aircraft and two medical vessels. Edmund acted as president until 1999 when he gave the position to his son Norbert.

The PMA is nonprofit and nondenominational service agency. It is considered part of the Restoration Movement. The PMA provides services such as emergency medical evacuations, search and rescue operations, medicine and food drops, church support, and passenger and cargo support.

Kalau and his wife retired in August 2004. He served as a pastor for the PMA's mission church in Guam, the Pacific Mission Fellowship. He died on 8 January 2014 in Tamuning, Guam. He was survived by his wife, their three children, and their grandchildren.

Further reading

References

External links 
 Pacific Mission Aviation official website

1928 births
2014 deaths
People from East Prussia
Protestant missionaries in the Federated States of Micronesia
Converts to Protestantism from atheism or agnosticism
20th-century American Lutheran clergy
Hitler Youth members
Lutheran missionaries in Oceania
Nyack College alumni
Thomas Jefferson University alumni
American Lutheran missionaries
Protestant missionaries in Guam
Protestant missionaries in Palau